Gnathifera proserga is a moth in the family Epermeniidae. It was described by Edward Meyrick in 1913. It is found in South Africa.

References

Endemic moths of South Africa
Epermeniidae
Moths described in 1913
Moths of Africa
Lepidoptera of South Africa